Madeleine Malonga (born 25 December 1993) is a French judoka. She won the silver medal in the women's 78 kg event, and gold medal at mixed team event, at the 2020 Summer Olympics held in Tokyo, Japan.

Career
She won a gold medal at the 2019 World Judo Championships.

In 2021, she won the gold medal in her event at the 2021 Judo World Masters held in Doha, Qatar.

She represented France at the 2020 Summer Olympics.

She won one of the bronze medals in her event at the 2022 Judo Grand Slam Paris held in Paris, France.

References

External links

 
 
 

1993 births
Living people
French female judoka
World judo champions
People from Soisy-sous-Montmorency
Judoka at the 2015 European Games
Judoka at the 2019 European Games
European Games medalists in judo
European Games gold medalists for France
European Games bronze medalists for France
Olympic judoka of France
Judoka at the 2020 Summer Olympics
Medalists at the 2020 Summer Olympics
Olympic medalists in judo
Olympic gold medalists for France
Olympic silver medalists for France
French sportspeople of Democratic Republic of the Congo descent
Sportspeople from Val-d'Oise
Black French sportspeople
21st-century French women